"I Want to Know You Before We Make Love" is a song written by Becky Hobbs and Candy Parton, and recorded by American country music band Alabama on their 1985 album, 40-Hour Week. It is better known by the cover version by the American country music artist Conway Twitty.  Twitty's version was released in July 1987 as the second single from his album, Borderline. The song reached #2 on the Billboard Hot Country Singles & Tracks chart.

Charts

Weekly charts

Year-end charts

References

1987 singles
Alabama (American band) songs
Conway Twitty songs
Song recordings produced by Jimmy Bowen
Songs written by Becky Hobbs
MCA Records singles
1985 songs